Sydney Charles Harpley  (19 April 1927 in London, England - 9 March 1992 ) was a British sculptor. He was elected to the Academy of Realist Art (ARA) on 25 Apr 1974 and the Royal Academy (R.A) on 24 Mar 1981.
His first major sale was Little girl circa 1956, a statue of a seated school girl, now in the Museum of New Zealand. The naturalness of the pose is considered to be due to his experience modelling artificial limbs in the late 1940s.

Other works include Study of Josephine Harpley (the artist's wife) on a Rope Hammock and Reading a Book. Mostly held privately. Some street sculpture in Hemel Hempstead new town from 1962. The joy of cycling in the Singapore Botanical Gardens Dated 1987.

References

1927 births
1992 deaths
20th-century British sculptors
English sculptors
English male sculptors
Modern sculptors
Royal Academicians